Gloria Katz (October 25, 1942 – November 25, 2018) was an American screenwriter and film producer, best known for her association with George Lucas. Along with her husband Willard Huyck, Katz created the screenplays of films including American Graffiti, Indiana Jones and the Temple of Doom and Howard the Duck. Katz was of Jewish descent.

Though uncredited, Katz and Huyck edited Lucas's Star Wars script as they acted as script doctors for Lucas. Katz and Huyck are responsible for much of the humor and development of the iconic Princess Leia in the Star Wars script.

Death
Katz died from ovarian cancer in 2018 at the age of 76, in her native Los Angeles.

Filmography

Film

Other credits

Television

References

External links 
 

1942 births
2018 deaths
20th-century American Jews
20th-century American screenwriters
20th-century American women writers
21st-century American Jews
21st-century American women
Film producers from California
Screenwriters from California
Jewish American screenwriters
American women screenwriters
People from Los Angeles
American women film producers
Deaths from ovarian cancer
Deaths from cancer in California